Jaume is a Catalan male given name. It is the equivalent of James.

Notable people
Notable people with this given name include:
 Jaume Aragall (born 1939), Spanish tenor
 Jaume Balagueró (born 1968), Spanish filmmaker
 Jaume Balmes (birth name: Jaime Balmes in Spanish) (1810-1848), Spanish philosopher, theologian, Catholic apologist, sociologist and political writer
 Jaume Barberà (born 1955), Spanish journalist and TV host
 Jaume Cabré (born 1947), Catalan writer
 Jaume Collet-Serra (born 1974), Spanish-American filmmaker
 Jaume Costa (born 1988), Spanish professional footballer
 Jaume Ferrer (14th century), Majorcan sailor and explorer
 Jaume Giró (born 1964), Catalan corporate executive
 Jaume Huguet (1412-1492), Catalan painter
 Jaume Llambi (born 1974), Spanish wheelchair basketball player
 Jaume Munar (born 1997), Spanish tennis player
 Jaume Muxart (d. 2019), Spanish painter
 Jaume Perich (d. 1995), Catalan illustrator and humorist
 Jaume Plensa (born 1955), Spanish artist
 Jaume Roig (early 15th century-1478), Valencian doctor and writer
 Jaume Roures (born 1950), Spanish businessman and film producer
 Jaume Sisa (born 1948), Spanish singer and songwriter

As surname
Notable people with the surname Jaume include:
 Pere Jaume Borrell, known as "Perejaume" (born 1957), Catalan contemporary artist
 Bernat Jaume (born 1995), Spanish squash player
 Carolina Jaume (born 1985), Ecuadorian actress

References

Catalan masculine given names